Russell Valentine Gardner is an educationist in the city of Dehradun. He has been the principal of St. Thomas' College, Dehradun for over three decades. He was also the Anglo-Indian representative for the first legislative assembly for the state of Uttarakhand, from 2002 to 2007, and the third assembly from 2012 to 2016.

References

Uttarakhand MLAs 2002–2007
Uttarakhand MLAs 2012–2017
People from Firozabad district
1946 births
Living people